Harpendyreus reginaldi is a butterfly in the family Lycaenidae. It is found in Uganda (from the western part of the country to Ruwenzori, Toro and Kigezi), Rwanda and the Democratic Republic of the Congo (from the eastern part of the country to Kivu).

References

Butterflies described in 1909
Harpendyreus